Simione Kuruvoli may refer to:
 Simione Kuruvoli (judoka)
 Simione Kuruvoli (rugby union)